Holsworthy Association Football Club is a football club based in Holsworthy, Devon, England.

History

The club was formed on 5 October 1891 by a group of local businessmen who met at 'The Rectory' to decide upon funding a football team and also to decide whether that team should play association football or rugby football, with Association Football winning. The club then played in the North Devon League, with their biggest success before the Second World War picking up the Devon Junior Cup in 1938–39. After the War, Holsworthy played their football in Stanhope Park until 1949 when they moved to their present home at Upcott Field. In 1952–53 Holsworthy left the North Devon League and entered the Plymouth & District League, winning the Championship in 1968–69 and again in 1969–70, and the Plymouth & District League Victory Cup in 1972–73. Their second season in the Plymouth & District League  also saw them pick up the Devon Senior Cup.

In 1971 the club joined the South Western League in 1971. They spent over thirty years in the South Western League, without ever winning the title. However, during this period they did win the Devon Premier Cup in 1971–72 and again in 1978–79.

The !978 −79 Season was exceptional, as the young team assembled and managed by Terry Andrews were successful on 4 fronts.
Winning the Devon Premier Cup 1 v 0 against Western league Elmore, at Plymouth Argyle. Winning the South West Sutton Transformer Cup 6v3 on aggregate - played over 2 legs. Winning the away leg 2v1.
Winning the Torridge Cup and Hansen Cup against Appledore.

Also in this period the club entered the FA Vase, three times reaching the First Round Proper. Having to stop playing in the competition when their pitch was classed as to small by the Football Association. Off the pitch floodlights were erected at the Upcott Field in 1997, and they were switched on by the then Plymouth Argyle manager, Mick Jones.

At the end of the 30-year period in the South Western League the club moved sideways in the English league system to the Devon County League in 2003, winning the title at their first attempt, managed by ex Plymouth Argyle legend + captain, Lee Cooper.

For the 2006–07 season, Holsworthy remained in the Devon County League under new manager Mickey Clark. They then joined the South West Peninsula League Premier Division in 2007 as founder members, with Keith Rickard taking the joint managerial role with Mickey Clarke for the 2008–09 season and winning the Torridge Cup that season.  However this was followed by a disatraus season where the club was relegated to Division One West finishing bottom of the Premier Division.  The club has since remained in Division One West of the South West Peninsula League.

For the 2013/14 season the 1st team was managed by Kevin Taylor with Tony Bayley taking over as chairman from Barry Parrish.

Ground

Holsworthy play their games at Upcott Field, North Road, Holsworthy EX22 6HF.

They are currently not allowed to compete in the F.A. competitions because their Upcott Field pitch is slightly too small to meet the minimum standards.

Honours
Sutton Transformer South West Cup 
1** Winners 978-79 - Manager Terry Andrews

Torridge Cup 
Winners 1938 −1939
Winners 1978 − 1979 - Manager Terry Andrews
Winners 1997 -  1998 - Manager Peter England
Winners 2001 − 2002 - Manager Lee Cooper
Winners 2002 − 2003

Hansen Cup
Winners 1978 −1979 - Manager Terry Andrews
Devon League  
Champions (1): 2003 – 2004 - Lee Cooper
Devon Premier Cup 
Winners (2): 1971 – 1972 - Manager Terry Andrews,
Winners1978 – 1979
Runners-up (1): 1969 – 1970
Devon Senior Cup  
Winners (1): 1953 – 1954
Runners Up (2):1967 – 1968, 1968 – 1969
Devon Junior Cup 
Winners (1): 1938 – 1939
Runners Up (1): 1936 – 1937
North Devon League
 Champions (2): 1923 – 1924 & 1975 – 1976
Runners Up (1): 1922 – 1923
Plymouth & District 
Champions (2): 1968 – 1969, 1969 – 1970
Runners Up (2):1967 – 1968, 1970 – 1971
Devon League Charity Shield 
Winners (1): 2004 – 2005

Club records

Highest League Position: 15th in South West Peninsula League Premier Division 2008–09
FA Vase Best Performance:

First round 1977–78, - Manager Terry Andrews
First round 1979–80 - Manager Terry Andrews
First round 1980–81 - Manager Terry Andrews

Players

Current squad

Former players
1. Players that have played/managed in the football league or any foreign equivalent to this level (i.e. fully professional league).

2. Players with full international caps.
Michael Preston

3. Shaun Taylor - Exeter - Swindon - Bristol City

4. Dave Walters - Plymouth Argyle

5. Sam Watts - Putford fc

6. Max Macdonald - Bendtner over 5 a side

References

External links
Club web site

Football clubs in Devon
Association football clubs established in 1891
1891 establishments in England
Football clubs in England
North Devon Football League
Devon County League
South West Peninsula League
Holsworthy